Simonas Gentvilas (born 28 September 1984) is a Lithuanian politician, a Member of the Seimas for Pajūris constituency and former Klaipėda City Councillor.

On 7 December 2020, he was approved to be the Minister of Environment in the Šimonytė Cabinet.

Biography
He is son of politician Eugenijus Gentvilas.

From the age of sixteen he studied abroad.  Graduated from a gymnasium in Karlskrona, Sweden.

Studied at universities in Sweden, Norway, Denmark, Belgium, Austria and Spain. He graduated from the University of Oslo in 2007 with a Bachelor’s degree in Sociology. In 2010 graduated from the University of Vienna with a Master's degree in Urban Development.

From 2015 to 2016 taught at Klaipeda College of Social Sciences.

Political career
In 2011, he became an advisor to the Mayor of Klaipeda.

Since the autumn of 2015, he has been the Vice-Chairman Liberal Movement.

From 2015 to 2016, he was Klaipėda City Councillor, the Head of the Liberal Movement group and the chairman of the City Development and Strategic Planning Committee in the Klaipėda City Council. 

Since 2016, he has been a Member of the Seimas, and since 2020 he has been elected in the Pajūris constituency.

References

1983 births
21st-century Lithuanian politicians
Liberal Movement (Lithuania) politicians
Living people
Members of the Seimas
Lithuanian expatriates in Sweden
Lithuanian expatriates in Norway
Environment ministers of Lithuania